The Carlos Palanca Memorial Awards for Literature winners in the year 1990 (rank, title of winning entry, name of author):


English division
Novel
Grand prize winner: Azucena Grajo Uranza, "Bamboo in the Wind"

Short story
Special prizes
Charlson Ong, "A Tropical Winter's Tale"
Vicar Rosales, "Islas"
Isagani R. Cruz, "Once Upon A Time Some Years From Now"
Victorino Manalo, "The Hunting Season"
Isagani R. Cruz, "What I Did Last Summer"

Short story for children
First prize: Ramon Sunico, "Two Friends, One World"
Second prize: Alfred A. Yuson, "The Boy Who Ate the Stars"
Third prize: Jaime An Lim, "Yasmin"

Essay
First prize: Isagani R. Cruz, "The Other Other: Towards a Post Colonial Poetics"
Second prizes: Buenaventura S. Medina Jr., "The Conscious Unconscious"
Eric Gamalinda, "The Unbearable Lightness of EDSA"
Third prize: No Winner

Poetry
First prize: Ricardo De Ungria, "Body English" and "Decimal Places"
Second prizes: 
Jose Y. Dalisay Jr., "Pinoy Septych and Other Poems"
Jaime An Lim, "Trios"
Fidelito Cortes, "Waitressing for the Exterminator"
Third prizes: Ma. Luisa A. Igloria, "Cartography"
J. Neil C. Garcia, "Fish Wife and Other Poems"
Lina Sagaral Reyes,  "Istorya"

One-act play
First prize: No Winner
Second prize: No Winner
Third prize: Dean Francis Alfar, "Fragments of Memory"

Full-length play
Honorable mentions:
Bobby Flores Villasis, "Eidolon"
Wilfrido Ma. Guerrero, "Retribution"

Filipino division
Nobela
Honorable mentions
Reynaldo A. Duque, "Gagamba"
Rosauro Dela Cruz, "Kwadresentinyal"

Maikiling Kuwento
First prize: Danilo Consumido, "Agam-agam ng Isang Historyador"
Second prize: Lav Indico Diaz, "Pula, Puti at Saka Blu, At Marami Pang Kolor"
Third prize: Henry Empeno, "Sanlibo't Isang Gabi ng mga Palabas sa Pag-aantay . . ."

Maikling Kuwentong Pambata
First prizes: Rene O. Villanueva, "Ang Unang Baboy sa Langit" at "Tungkung Langit at Alunsina"
Second prize: Ruben D. Canlas Jr, "Ang mga Kagila-gilalas na Pakikipagsapalaran nina Alegria at Andante sa Bimbolimbo" 
Reynaldo A. Duque, "Angalo at Aran"
Third prizes: 
Ramon Sunico, "Mata at Mangga"
Edgardo B. Maranan, "Si Kidlat, Si Kulog, Si Kilot"

Sanaysay
First prize: Isagani R. Cruz, "Ang Buhay sa Salamin ng Sining: Ang Kudeta Bilang Texto"
Second prize: Josephine Barrios, "Ang Sinderelang Hindi Sinderela"
Third prize: Virgilio S. Almario, "Pasyon at Katwiran sa Likod ng Salamin"

Tula
First prize: Ruth Elynia S. Mabanglo, "Anyaya ng Imperyalista"
Second prize: Romulo P. Baquiran Jr., "Baryo"
Third prize: Lilia Quindoza Santiago, "Ordinaryo at Iba pang Tula"

Dulang May Isang Yugto
First prize: Chris Millado, "Usapang Babae"
Second prize: Rosauro Dela Cruz, "Ang Pagliliwanag ng Isip ni Cecillo Segismundo"
Third prize: Bienvenido Noriega Jr., "Naikuwento Lang sa Akin"

Dulang Ganap ang Haba
First prize: Bienvenido Noriega Jr., "Deuterium"
Second prize: Manuel R. Buising, "Lista sa Tubig"
Third prize: Rene O. Villanueva, "Botong"

Dulang Pantelebisyon
First prizes: 
Emmanuel Q. Palo, "Ang Pagbabalik ni Kiwada"
Manuel R. Buising, "Patay-Bata"
Second prize: Eli Rueda Guieb III, "Pilat"
Third prizes: 
Melchor Salandanan Ventura, "Mrs. Raquel V. Matias"
Jovenal Velasco, "Si Tomboy atbp."
Honorable mentions
Rolando S. Salvana, "Spirit"
Elsa Martinez Coscolluela, "Without Ceremony"

More winners by year

References
 

1990
Palanca Awards